The 2018 AFC Cup Final was the final match of the 2018 AFC Cup, the 15th edition of the AFC Cup, Asia's secondary club football tournament organized by the Asian Football Confederation (AFC).

The final was contested as a single match between Al-Quwa Al-Jawiya from Iraq and Altyn Asyr from Turkmenistan. The match was hosted by Al-Quwa Al-Jawiya at the Basra Sports City in Basra on 27 October 2018.

Al-Quwa Al-Jawiya won the final 2–0 for their third consecutive and overall AFC Cup title.

Teams

This was Al-Quwa Al-Jawiya's third consecutive AFC Cup final, a record shared with Al-Faisaly (2005 to 2007) and Al-Kuwait (2011 to 2013). If they were to win the final, they would become the first team to win three consecutive AFC Cup titles, and also tie Al-Kuwait as record three-time winners of the AFC Cup.

Altyn Asyr were the first team from Turkmenistan to reach the AFC Cup final. If they were to win the final, they would become the second team from Central Asia to win the AFC Cup, after Nasaf from Uzbekistan in 2011.

Venue

This was the second AFC Cup final played in Iraq, after the 2012 final played at the Franso Hariri Stadium in Arbil. While Al-Quwa Al-Jawiya were also the home team in the 2016 AFC Cup Final, they hosted the match at the Suheim Bin Hamad Stadium in Doha, Qatar, as Iraqi teams were not allowed to host their home matches during that time. The ban was lifted in March 2018, and Al-Quwa Al-Jawiya played their subsequent home matches at the Karbala Sports City in Karbala.

Road to the final

Note: In all results below, the score of the finalist is given first (H: home; A: away).

Format
The final was played as a single match, with the host team (winners of the West Asia Zonal final) alternated from the previous season's final.

If tied after regulation, extra time and, if necessary, penalty shoot-out was used to decide the winner.

Match

Details

See also
2018 AFC Champions League Final

References

External links
, the-AFC.com
AFC Cup 2018, stats.the-AFC.com

AFC Cup finals
Final
October 2018 sports events in Asia
Al-Quwa Al-Jawiya matches
International club association football competitions hosted by Iraq